The Thomas H. Hughes House is a historic house in Johnston, Rhode Island.  The -story wood-frame house was built c. 1845 by Zacharias French, and exhibits simple but well-proportioned Greek Revival style.  The house is most notable as the residence for some years of Thomas H. Hughes, owner of a local dye processing factory and for whom the Hughesdale neighborhood of Johnston is named.  He apparently lived in this house until 1877, when he had a larger house (no longer extant) built.

The house was listed on the National Register of Historic Places in 1979.

See also
 National Register of Historic Places listings in Providence County, Rhode Island

References

Houses on the National Register of Historic Places in Rhode Island
Houses in Providence County, Rhode Island
Buildings and structures in Johnston, Rhode Island
National Register of Historic Places in Providence County, Rhode Island